Safar Sardar (born 17 May 1989 in Kolkata, West Bengal) is an Indian footballer who plays as a defender for Mohun Bagan A.C. in the I-League and Calcutta Premier Division.

Career

Early career
Sardar started his career at Chirag United in 2009 and stayed till 2010. He then joined Mohammedan for two years.

East Bengal
Sardar joined East Bengal FC for the 2012–13 I-League season on 15 May 2012.

United Sikkim (loan)
On 25 August 2012, East Bengal agreed to loan Sardar to United Sikkim on a season-long deal, where he was given the number 32 shirt.
Sardar made his debut for United Sikkim F.C. on 2 December 2012 during an I-League match against Churchill Brothers S.C. at the Paljor Stadium in Gangtok, Sikkim in which he was in Starting 11; United Sikkim drew the match 0–0.

References

Indian footballers
1989 births
Living people
I-League players
Mohun Bagan AC players
Association football defenders
Footballers from Kolkata